The 1948 Baltimore Colts season was their second in the AAFC. The team improved on their previous season's output of 2–11–1, winning seven games. They qualified for the playoffs for the first and only time in franchise history.

The team's statistical leaders included Y. A. Tittle with 2,522 passing yards, Bus Mertes with 680 rushing yards, and Billy Hillenbrand with 970 receiving yards and 78 points scored.

Season schedule

Playoff schedule

Division standings

References

Baltimore Colts (1947–1950) seasons
Baltimore Colts